Taras Vyacheslavovych Chornovil (born on 1 June 1964 in Lviv) is a Ukrainian politician and is a former deputy in the Verkhovna Rada (Ukrainian Parliament).

Biography
Taras Chornovil was born on 1 June 1964 in Lviv, Ukrainian SSR, Soviet Union (now Ukraine), to Vyacheslav Chornovil, a former Soviet dissident, politician, and founder of the People's Movement of Ukraine, and his wife, Olena Antoniv.

Chornovil studied at the Faculty of Biology at the Lviv University. From 1981-1982, he was a laboratory assistant at Lviv Polytechnic Institute. From 1982-1984, Chornovil served in the Soviet Army. From 1985, he was a member of the Ukrainian Helsinki Group, and one of the founders of the Union of Independent Ukrainian Youth. From 1987, he was an editor in the "Ukrayinskyi Vistnyk" and the main editor of the "Moloda Ukrayina" newspapers.

Political career

From 1990-1994, Taras was a deputy of the Lviv Oblast Rada. From 1995 he was the main editor of the Chas newspaper. In 2000 and 2002, Chornovil was elected as a deputy to the Lviv City Council. From May 2002, Chornovil was a member of the Our Ukraine fraction of the Verkhovna Rada (Ukraine's parliament). During the Orange Revolution in Ukraine, Chornovil switched from Our Ukraine to the Party of Regions, a party that was antagonistic to Our Ukraine. In December 2004, Taras was the head of the Viktor Yanukovych election committee during the second voting round in the 2004 presidential election. In the 2006 Ukrainian parliamentary election, Chornovil was elected as a deputy to the Ukrainian parliament as a member of the Party of Regions (he was 3th on their party list). On 28 November 2006, he was one of the only two Party of Regions MPs who voted in favour of the law recognizing Holodomor as genocide.

In October 2008 Chornovil left the Party of Regions. In June 2009 Chornovil was excluded from the structure of the Party of Regions faction by a decision of the political council of the Party of Regions.

After the first round of the 2010 presidential election Chornovil called on Ukrainians to vote for Yulia Tymoshenko (with Viktor Yanukovych being the other candidate during that round).

Chornovil joined Reforms for the Future in February 2011. On 9 February 2012 Chornovil left that faction.

In the 2012 parliamentary elections Chornovil was a candidate in single-member district number 212 (first-past-the-post wins a parliament seat) located in Kyiv; he became sixth in this district with 6.47% of the votes thus failed to win parliamentary representation.

References

External links 

 Personal Twitter thread

1964 births
Living people
Politicians from Lviv
University of Lviv alumni
Our Ukraine (political party) politicians
Party of Regions politicians
Independent politicians in Ukraine
Third convocation members of the Verkhovna Rada
Fourth convocation members of the Verkhovna Rada
Fifth convocation members of the Verkhovna Rada
Sixth convocation members of the Verkhovna Rada
People of Ukraine without Kuchma
Laureates of the Honorary Diploma of the Verkhovna Rada of Ukraine